Estarreja ( or ) is a municipality in Portugal. The population in 2011 was 26,997, in an area of 108.17 km2. It had 22,746 eligible voters in 2006.  The only city in the municipality is Estarreja, which is in the urban parish of Beduido. The city itself has a population of approximately 7,000. It is built along the banks of the Antuã River, near the Ria de Aveiro. Estarreja is an important chemical industry centre, being the place where several industrial facilities of CUF are located.

The municipality is part of the Aveiro District, in the Baixo Vouga subregion, in the Centro Region, Portugal.

Main train stations are Estarreja and Avanca.

The present Mayor is Diamantino Sabina, elected by a coalition between the Social Democratic Party and the People's Party. The municipal holiday is 13 June, the feast of Saint Anthony of Padua.

Demographics 

In 1926 a portion of territory with about 13 000 inhabitants was taken away from Estarreja municipality to become the municipality of Murtosa. Hence the population drop from 1900 to 1930.

Parishes 
Administratively, the municipality is divided into 5 civil parishes (freguesias):
 Avanca 
 Beduído e Veiros
 Canelas e Fermelã
 Pardilhó (town)
 Salreu  (town)

Cities and towns 
 Estarreja (city)
 Avanca (town)
 Pardilhó (town)
 Salreu  (town)

Notable people 
António Egas Moniz (1874–1955), the famous Portuguese doctor was born in Avanca, Estarreja. He was the first Portuguese national to receive a Nobel Prize in 1949.

References

External links 
 Municipality official website

 
Municipalities of Aveiro District
Cities in Portugal